Stanyarne Wilson (January 10, 1860 – February 14, 1928) was a U.S. Representative from South Carolina.

Born in Yorkville (now York), South Carolina, Wilson attended King's Mountain Military School and Washington and Lee University, Lexington, Virginia.
He studied law.
He was admitted to the bar by an act of the legislature in 1880, then being a minor.
He settled in Spartanburg, South Carolina, in 1881.
Practiced law and was also interested in cotton manufactures, gold mining, iron works, and agriculture.
He served as member of the State house of representatives 1884–1886 and 1890–1892.
He served in the State senate 1892–1895.
He served as member of the State constitutional convention in 1895.

Wilson was elected as a Democrat to the Fifty-fourth, Fifty-fifth, and Fifty-sixth Congresses (March 4, 1895 – March 3, 1901).
He continued the practice of law in Spartanburg, South Carolina, and later in Richmond, Virginia, where he moved in 1913.
He returned to Spartanburg, South Carolina, in January 1928, and died there February 14, 1928.
He was interred in Church of the Advent Cemetery.

Sources

1860 births
1928 deaths
Democratic Party members of the United States House of Representatives from South Carolina
Democratic Party members of the South Carolina House of Representatives
Democratic Party South Carolina state senators
People from York, South Carolina
Politicians from Spartanburg, South Carolina
South Carolina lawyers
19th-century American lawyers
20th-century American lawyers
Washington and Lee University alumni